Kavalerovo is an urban locality (an urban-type settlement) and the administrative center of Kavalerovsky District of Primorsky Krai, Russia. Population:

References

Urban-type settlements in Primorsky Krai
Populated places established in the 1910s